Braeloch is a community south of the city of Kelowna.

Images

References

Populated places on Okanagan Lake
Populated places in the Regional District of Central Okanagan
Populated places in the Okanagan Country
Regional District of Central Okanagan
Neighbourhoods in Kelowna
Settlements in British Columbia